D'Anna or D'anna may refer to:

 Baldassare d'Anna (c. 1560-after 1639), Italian painter
 Claude d'Anna (born 1945), French film director and screenwriter
 Emanuele D'Anna (born 1982), Italian footballer
 Lorenzo D'Anna (born 1972), Italian footballer
 Lynnette D'anna (born 1955), Canadian writer
 Michael D'Anna (born 1972), American film director
 Vito D'Anna (1718–1769), Italian painter
 D'Anna Fortunato (born 1945), American mezzo-soprano opera singer
 D'Anna Biers or Number Three (Battlestar Galactica), a fictional Cylon in the reimagined Battlestar Galactica television series

See also
 Danna (disambiguation)
 Deanna